The Old Dad Mountains are a mountain range in San Bernardino County, California.

The range is named for Joseph "Old Dad" Wallace, a rail worker turned prospector from nearby Kelso. Accused of the murder of his fiancée, he left town and supported himself through mining the mountain range with his team of donkeys.

References 

Mountain ranges of Southern California
Mountain ranges of San Bernardino County, California